There have been five baronetcies created for members of the old established family of Peyton of Peyton Hall in the parish of Boxford in Suffolk, all of whom were descended from Sir Robert Peyton (d. 1518) of Isleham in Cambridgeshire, grandson and heir of Thomas Peyton (1418–1484) of Isleham, twice Sheriff of Cambridgeshire and Huntingdonshire, in 1443 and 1453. All the baronetcies are extinct.

The Peyton Baronetcy, of Isleham in the County of Cambridge, was created in the Baronetage of England on 22 May 1611 for John Peyton, a great-grandson of Sir Robert Peyton. The first and second Baronets both served as Member of Parliament for Cambridgeshire. This Baronetcy was extinct in 1815 on the death of the 8th Baronet.

The Peyton Baronetcy, of Knowlton in the County of Kent, was created in the Baronetage of England on 29 June 1611 for Samuel Peyton, also a great-grandson of Sir Robert Peyton and a second cousin of Sir John Peyton, 1st Baronet of Isleham. His son Sir Thomas Peyton, 2nd Baronet, was a Member of Parliament in the Restoration Parliament of 1660. The Baronetcy became extinct on his death.

The Peyton Baronetcy, of Doddington in the County of Cambridge, was created on 10 December 1660 for John Peyton, a great-grandson of Sir Robert Peyton and second cousin once removed of the first baronets of Isleham and Knowlton. This Sir John died unmarried soon after his preferment but the baronetcy was recreated on 21 March 1667 for his brother Algernon Peyton. The Baronetcy became extinct on the death of the 3rd Baronet in 1771. The Baronetcy was created for the third time on 18 September 1776 for Henry Dashwood, son of Margaret Peyton, daughter of Sir Sewster Peyton, second Baronet of the second creation. Dashwood, who was related to the Dashwood baronets changed his name by Act of Parliament to Henry Dashwood Peyton. From about 1830 the family was seated at Swifts House, Stoke Lyne, Oxfordshire. The second baronet served as High Sheriff of Cambridgeshire and Huntingdonshire for 1808 and the fourth, fifth, sixth and seventh Baronets served as High Sheriff of Oxfordshire for 1871, 1881, 1896 and 1928 respectively. The first and second Baronets sat as MPs for Cambridgeshire in 1782 and 1802 respectively. The baronetcy became extinct on the death of the seventh Baronet in 1962.

Peyton baronets, of Isleham (1611)
 Sir John Peyton, 1st Baronet (1560–1617)
 Sir Edward Peyton, 2nd Baronet (died 1657)
 Sir John Peyton, 3rd Baronet (1607–1666)
 Sir John Peyton, 4th Baronet (died 1721)
 Sir Yelverton Peyton, 5th Baronet (died 1748)
 Sir Charles Peyton, 6th Baronet (died 1760)
 Sir John Peyton, 7th Baronet (died 1772)
 Sir Yelverton Peyton, 8th Baronet (1739–1815)

Peyton baronets, of Knowlton (1611)
 Sir Samuel Peyton, 1st Baronet (c.1590–1623)
 Sir Thomas Peyton, 2nd Baronet (c.1613–1684)

Peyton baronets, of Doddington (1660; First creation)
 Sir John Peyton, 1st Baronet (died 1661)

Peyton baronets, of Doddington (1667; Second creation)
 Sir Algernon Peyton, 1st Baronet (1645–1671)
 Sir Sewster Peyton, 2nd Baronet (died 1717)
 Sir Thomas Peyton, 3rd Baronet (died 1771)

Peyton baronets, of Doddington (1776; Third creation)

 Sir Henry Dashwood Peyton, 1st Baronet (1736–1789)
 Sir Henry Peyton, 2nd Baronet (1779–1854)
 Sir Henry Peyton, 3rd Baronet (1804–1866)
 Sir Algernon Peyton, 4th Baronet (1833–1872)
 Sir Thomas Peyton, 5th Baronet (1817–1888)
 Sir Algernon Francis Peyton, 6th Baronet (1855–1916)
 Sir Algernon Peyton, 7th Baronet (1889–1962)

References

A Genealogical and Heraldic History of the Extinct and Dormant Baronetcies of England Ireland and Scotland (1838) Burke and Burke p 406 Google Books
A Genealogical and Heraldic History of the Extinct and Dormant Baronetcies of England Ireland and Scotland 2nd Edition (1844) Burke and Burke p 411 Google Books

 

Extinct baronetcies in the Baronetage of England
Extinct baronetcies in the Baronetage of Great Britain
Boxford, Suffolk